Festival International de Films de Montréal (FIFM), also known in English as the New Montreal FilmFest 
was a film festival held in Montreal in 2005 to focus on Francophone films. Originally intended as an annual event, the festival became mired in rivalry with two competing festivals—the Montreal World Film Festival and the Toronto International Film Festival—such that the New Montreal FilmFest was ultimately held only once.

The founding of the FIFM resulted from a yearlong dispute between the funding agencies SODEC and Telefilm Canada and the organizers of the Montreal World Film Festival (WFF)—Festival des Films du Monde - Montréal (FFM)—in 2004. These two former sponsors of the FFM/WFF called for proposals for a new film festival and ultimately shifted their funding to the New Montreal FilmFest, which was inaugurated in October 2005.

The New Montreal FilmFest, produced by Spectra Entertainment (owners of the Montreal Spectrum theater), was initially headed by Daniel Langlois, founder of SoftImage (subsequently sold to Microsoft) and Ex-Centris. Langlois had previously directed the Montreal Festival of New Cinema and New Media—Festival de Nouveau Cinema et Nouveaux Media, which was renamed Festival du Nouveau Cinéma in 2004 (Montreal's independent film festival). The involvement of Langlois intended to counter prior criticisms of lack of professionalism in the FFM/WFF (run by Serge Losique) and to merge the FCMM (renamed the FNC in 2004) and the New Montreal FilmFest into one new festival. The FNC would not agree to such a merger, and scheduling conflicts between the New Montreal FilmFest and the FNC led to Langlois' early departure from FilmFest.

The 2005 event was eventually directed by Moritz de Hadeln, who had previously headed the Locarno International Film Festival, the Berlin International Film Festival, the Venice International Film Festival—and founded the Visions du Réel documentary film festival of Nyon, Switzerland. Moritz de Hadeln had also been a long-time rival of Serge Losique's.

"FilmFest officials decided to concentrate on Francophone films, avoiding the Hollywood focus of the Toronto International Film Festival and the world cinema of [Serge] Losique’s festival [FFM/WFF].". But the 2005 inaugural New Montreal FilmFest raised early criticism and did not meet expectations. The advance negative publicity and its timing and selection of films were criticized widely, resulting in poor ticket sales. In early 2006 the New Montreal FilmFest was terminated:

Telefilm revealed that FilmFest lost $850,000, spurring Losique to call for a public inquiry into the "resounding and humiliating failure" of the Montreal FilmFest.

References

See also
 Festival du Nouveau Cinéma (FNC), formerly Festival of New Cinema and New Media (FCMM)
 Montreal World Film Festival (FFM)
 Fantasia International Film Festival (FanTasia)
 Montreal International Jazz Festival (FIJM)

Film festivals in Montreal
Film festivals established in 2005
Recurring events disestablished in 2006
Defunct film festivals in Canada
2005 film festivals
2005 festivals in North America